Mahni Ghorashi is an American entrepreneur.

Early life and education
Mahni Ghorashi was born in Knoxville, Tennessee. He attended Farragut High School, received BS degrees from MIT in 2005, attended the PhD program in English at Yale, and received an MBA from Vanderbilt University.

Early career
Ghorashi started his career as an entrepreneur in Silicon Valley, where he founded and help grow a number of ventures to exit in Silicon Valley, including Bina (acquired Roche), Trapit (acquired ScribbleLive), and LiteScape (acquired Dell).  In 2014, Ghorashi co-founded Clear Labs,  a private genomics testing company headquartered in San Carlos, California, United States. It conducts high-throughput DNA sequencing tests to determine if food samples contain the genetic materials of specific pathogens. It can also verify a food's ingredients, its GMO status, or whether it has been contaminated by human or animal DNA.

Clear Labs was founded by Ghorashi and Sasan Amini, both of whom left their jobs at genomics companies to start Clear Labs. They acquired $6.5 million in series A financing in 2015. In 2017, the company closed a $16 million Series B funding round and followed by another $21 million round in October 2018. The company raised a follow-on round of $18M in May 14, 2020 and $60M Series C for a total of $123.5M. The company was listed as one of Forbe's 25 most innovative Ag-tech startups.

Public Policy, Investment and Education 
Mahni currently serves in the role of Chief Strategy Officer at Launch Tennessee, the state of Tennessee's early-stage venture economic growth engine, to sit on the executive team. Launch Tennessee stimulates the statewide economy by facilitating capital formation, market building and providing the needed resources to ensure sustainable growth for entrepreneurs and investors. As Chief Strategy Officer, Ghorashi oversees state-wide venture capital and portfolio investments, state-wide entrepreneurial incubators, university and government-lab tech-transfer and licensing programs, university engagement, private sector and policy outreach.

He's guest-lectured on entrepreneurship at Stanford and MIT Universities.

Personal life 
Mahni is a classical pianist, having studied piano with faculty of the Juilliard School.

References 

Living people
21st-century American businesspeople
American technology company founders
American technology executives
Massachusetts Institute of Technology alumni
Yale University alumni
Vanderbilt University alumni
Businesspeople from Tennessee
1983 births